David Breda (born 22 November 1971) is a Czech former football midfielder. He played in the Gambrinus liga, making over 200 league appearances. He scored in the UEFA Cup for Liberec against Liverpool in November 2000. In 2011, at the age of 39, Breda was still playing in the Czech leagues, for Czech Fourth Division side SK Převýšov.

References

External links

1971 births
Living people
Czech footballers
Czech First League players
FC Hradec Králové players
FK Jablonec players
FC Slovan Liberec players
Fortuna Düsseldorf players
Expatriate footballers in Germany
Association football midfielders